Dielsiodoxa is a small genus of flowering plants in the family Ericaceae. 

The species, all endemic to Western Australia, include:

Dielsiodoxa leucantha (E.Pritz.) Albr. syn.  Monotoca leucantha
Dielsiodoxa lycopodioides Albr.
Dielsiodoxa oligarrhenoides (F.Muell.) Albr.
Dielsiodoxa propullulans Albr.
Dielsiodoxa tamariscina (F.Muell.) Albr.

The genus was  first formally described in 2010.

References

Epacridoideae
Ericaceae genera